Victoria Mary Owen (1949–2008) was an Australian public servant and diplomat.

Owen joined the Department of Foreign Affairs in 1972. Her early postings were to Greece and Amman. While her then husband Donald Kingsmill was ambassador to Saudi Arabia (1976–1979), Owen learned Arabic. In the period, she also gave birth to two daughters, Katharine Mary in September 1976 and Alexandra in July 1978. A third child followed, a son James, in 1984.

She moved into her first ambassadorial role in 1990, as Australian Ambassador to Syria, with non-resident accreditation to Lebanon, living in Damascus until 1992. She served a second time as an ambassador from 1998 to 2002, this time as Ambassador to Egypt, with non-resident accreditation to Sudan and Algeria. Whilst living in Egypt she was one of only five women ambassadors from 140 embassies in Cairo.

Owen died in 2008 after a battle against cancer.

In 2010 Victoria Owen Circuit, in the Canberra suburb of Casey, was named in her honour.

References

1949 births
2008 deaths
Ambassadors of Australia to Algeria
Ambassadors of Australia to Egypt
Ambassadors of Australia to Tunisia
Ambassadors of Australia to Lebanon
Ambassadors of Australia to Syria
University of Melbourne alumni
Australian women ambassadors